The 2018 Gamba Osaka season was Gamba Osaka's 25th season in the J1 League and 31st overall in the Japanese top flight.   It saw them compete in the 18 team J1 League as well as the J.League Cup and Emperor's Cup competitions.

Gamba will begin the season with a new manager in the shape of Brazilian, former Cerezo Osaka boss Levir Culpi who replaced long-standing manager Kenta Hasegawa who moved to FC Tokyo.

Culpi was fired after poor form saw Gamba sit in the J1 relegation zone at the halfway point of the season.   He was replaced by Gamba Under-23 manager Tsuneyasu Miyamoto on July 23.

Transfers

Prior to the end of 2017, Gamba announced the capture of young defenders; Tetsuya Yamaguchi and Riku Matsuda as well as midfielder Yuya Fukuda all straight out of high school.   Meanwhile, midfielder Ren Shibamoto and attacker Haruto Shirai were promoted to the first team squad after impressing for Gamba's Under-23 side in J3 during 2017.

Shortly before Christmas the signings of attacking midfielder Shinya Yajima and former Gamba youth product, centre-back Shunya Suganuma were announced, with the duo arriving from Urawa Reds and Montedio Yamagata respectively.   This news was followed a few days later with the news of the signing of Japan Under-17 midfielder Keito Nakamura from Tokyo-based Mitsubishi Yowa SC as well as the promotion of Under-23 goalkeeper Kosei Tani to the first team squad.

2 league games into the campaign and Gamba secured the signing of former Brazil Under-20 defensive midfielder Matheus Jesus on loan from Portuguese side Estoril.   His contracted would run until the end of the year.

Long serving goalkeeper Yosuke Fujigaya, who had made over 250 league appearances for the club announced his retirement at the end of the 2017 season after spending the previous 3 years providing backup to established number 1, Masaaki Higashiguchi.   Holding midfielder Tatsuya Uchida turned his loan move to Tokyo Verdy into a permanent one and he would be joined at the Tokyo club by young forward Hiromu Kori who had spent the previous season on loan with Gamba Under-23, scoring 3 goals in 17 appearances.

Additionally experienced Japanese-born but Korean passport holding centre-back Kim Jung-ya moved to Vegalta Sendai, while Kashima Antlers forward Shuhei Akasaki returned to his parent club following a disappointing loan spell which yielded only 2 goals.   Another forward with a poor goalscoring record, Hiroto Goya moved to J2 League outfit Tokushima Vortis in an effort to rediscover his scoring touch, he would be joined in J2 by backup goalkeeper Ken Tajiri who extended his loan spell at Zweigen Kanazawa for a further season.   Gamba U-23 centre back and sometimes central midfielder made the move to J3 side Grulla Morioka after making close to 50 appearances in J3 but failing to crack Gamba's senior side.

At the beginning of January, a press conference was held confirming that key central midfielder Yosuke Ideguchi would join English EFL Championship side Leeds United.   The Japanese international would however join Spanish Segunda División outfit Cultural Leonesa on loan for the remainder of the 2017–18 European club season.   In the day's following Ideguchi's departure it was confirmed that young utility player So Hirao had been allowed to join Avispa Fukuoka on loan for 2018 and centre-back / defensive midfielder Shogo Nakahara had completed his loan spell with the club and would return to his parent club, Consadole Sapporo.   Veteran midfielder Takahiro Futagawa also announced that he would spend another year on loan with Tokyo Verdy in J2 having spend the previous 18 months in Japan's capital.

The first of February saw the announcement that young South Korean centre-back Bae Soo-yong would join J3 outfit Giravanz Kitakyushu on a season long loan.   He spent the 2017 campaign with Gamba's Under-23 side, scoring once in 24 games and earning to red cards in the process.

During the mid-season transfer window, it was announced at the end of June that midfielders Shinya Yajima and Jin Izumisawa would spend the second half of the year on loan at Vegalta Sendai and Tokyo Verdy respectively.   Both players had struggled for game time with the top team and had spent large chunks of the season playing with Gamba U-23 in J3.   Their departures cleared the way for the arrival of Renofa Yamaguchi midfielder Kosuke Onose at the end of July.

Following the departure of Brazilian coach Levir Culpi in July, Matheus Jesus, who Culpi brought to the club on loan at the start of the season, found game time hard to come by and his loan from Portuguese side Estoril was cancelled by mutual consent.   New head coach Tsuneyasu Miyamoto moved further to re-shape the squad by bringing in Vissel Kobe striker Kazuma Watanabe on a permanent deal while the tall Shun Nagasawa moved in the opposite direction on loan until the end of the year.

In

Out

Coaching staff

The Coaching Staff for the 2018 J1 League season;

First team squad
Appearances and goals as of the beginning of the 2018 season.

* indicates player returned to Gamba Osaka from a loan spell with this club.

J1 League

On 13 January, Gamba's first 2 fixtures for the season were announced, at home to Nagoya Grampus and away to Kashima Antlers.   The dates for the remaining games were made public on January 24.

Gamba endured something of a roller coaster ride during the 2018 season, a disastrous start under Brazilian coach Levir Culpi, including 5 losses in their first 6 games, saw Gamba spend most of the year facing the very real prospect of relegation to J2.
Fortunately after Culpi was replaced by Gamba U-23 coach and club legend Tsuneyasu Miyamoto, their fortunes began to change.   Miyamoto's arrival initially brought better performances if not results, but along with returning injured players, midfield general Yasuyuki Konno and Brazilian attacker Ademilson as well as the arrival of the experienced forward Kazuma Watanabe from Vissel Kobe and winger Kosuke Onose from Renofa Yamaguchi, Gamba started to build a head of steam culminating in a 9-game winning streak which propelled them to the top half of the standings and a final position of 9th.

* = all times Japan Standard Time.

Match Day Line-Ups

The following players appeared for Gamba Osaka during the 2018 J1 League:

 = Substitute on,  = Substitute Off,  = Number of goals scored,  = Yellow Card and  = Red Card.

Emperor's Cup

Gamba entered the 2018 Emperor's Cup at the 2nd round stage where they were drawn at home to Kwansei Gakuin University on 6 June.   The match ended in an embarrassing 2-1 defeat after extra time.

Match Day Line-Ups

  = Substitute on,  = Substitute Off,  = Number of goals scored,  = Yellow Card and  = Red Card.

J.League Cup Results

Having failing to qualify for the 2018 Asian Champions League, Gamba joined the J.League Cup at the group stage for the first time since 2014 when they went on to win the competition.   The format was rejigged prior to the season with groups of 7 being replaced with groups of 4.   Gamba were drawn in Group C along with Urawa Reds, Sanfrecce Hiroshima and Nagoya Grampus playing each team home and away.

Despite losing all three home group stage games, including two 4-1 reverses, Gamba qualified for the playoff round by virtue of 3 wins on the road and were paired with Júbilo Iwata.   Home and away victories secured a passage to the quarter-finals where they faced off against Yokohama F. Marinos.
A 4-0 hammering in the home leg was followed by a 3-1 defeat in Yokohama to send Gamba crashing out 7-1 on aggregate.

* = all times Japan Standard Time.

Match Day Line-Ups

  = Substitute on,  = Substitute Off,  = Number of goals scored,  = Yellow Card and  = Red Card.

Squad statistics

Statistics accurate as of match played on 1 December 2018

Goalscorers

Assists

Gamba Osaka Under-23

Gamba Osaka's Under-23 side compete in the J3 League where they are allowed to name 3 overage players of which one must be a goalkeeper.   On January 24, their fixtures for the 2018 J3 League season were announced.   Due to there being only 17 teams in the league, rounds 17 and 22 were bye rounds while the round 8 fixture against FC Tokyo Under-23 was played at a later date so as to fall on a national holiday.   The round 15 game against Thespakusatsu Gunma was postponed until August due to a large earthquake that occurred in Osaka in late June.

* = all times Japan Standard Time.

U-23 Squad statistics

Statistics accurate as of match played on 2 December 2018

References

Gamba Osaka
Gamba Osaka seasons